The 1869 Pennsylvania gubernatorial election occurred on October 12, 1869. Incumbent governor John W. Geary, a Republican, was a candidate for re-election. Geary defeated Democratic candidate Asa Packer to win another term.

Results

References

1869
Pennsylvania
Gubernatorial
October 1869 events